The ISM radio bands are portions of the radio spectrum reserved internationally for industrial, scientific, and medical (ISM) purposes, excluding applications in telecommunications. 
Examples of applications for the use of radio frequency (RF) energy in these bands include radio-frequency process heating, microwave ovens, and medical diathermy machines.  The powerful emissions of these devices can create electromagnetic interference and disrupt radio communication using the same frequency, so these devices are limited to certain bands of frequencies. In general, communications equipment operating in ISM bands must tolerate any interference generated by ISM applications, and users have no regulatory protection from ISM device operation in these bands.

Despite the intent of the original allocations, in recent years the fastest-growing use of these bands has been for short-range, low-power wireless communications systems, since these bands are often approved for such devices, which can be used without a government license, as would otherwise be required for transmitters; ISM frequencies are often chosen for this purpose as they already must tolerate interference issues. Cordless phones, Bluetooth devices, near-field communication (NFC) devices, garage door openers, baby monitors, and wireless computer networks (Wi-Fi) may all use the ISM frequencies, although these low-power transmitters are not considered to be ISM devices.

Definition
The ISM bands are defined by the ITU Radio Regulations (article 5) in footnotes 5.138, 5.150, and 5.280 of the Radio Regulations. Individual countries' use of the bands designated in these sections may differ due to variations in national radio regulations.  Because communication devices using the ISM bands must tolerate any interference from ISM equipment, unlicensed operations are typically permitted to use these bands, since unlicensed operation typically needs to be tolerant of interference from other devices anyway.  The ISM bands share allocations with unlicensed and licensed operations; however, due to the high likelihood of harmful interference, licensed use of the bands is typically low.  In the United States, uses of the ISM bands are governed by Part 18 of the Federal Communications Commission (FCC) rules, while Part 15 contains the rules for unlicensed communication devices, even those that share ISM frequencies. In Europe, the ETSI is responsible for regulating the use of Short Range Devices, some of which operate in ISM bands.

Frequency allocations 
The allocation of radio frequencies is provided according to Article 5 of the ITU Radio Regulations (edition 2012).

In order to improve harmonisation in spectrum utilisation, the majority of service-allocations stipulated in this document were incorporated in national Tables of Frequency Allocations and Utilisations which is within the responsibility of the appropriate national administration. The allocation might be primary, secondary, exclusive, and shared.
primary allocation:  is indicated by writing in capital letters (see example below)
secondary allocation: is indicated by small letters
exclusive or shared utilization: is within the responsibility of administrations

 ITU frequency allocations

Type A (footnote 5.138) = frequency bands are designated for ISM applications. The use of these frequency bands for ISM applications shall be subject to special authorization by the administration concerned, in agreement with other administrations whose radiocommunication services might be affected. In applying this provision, administrations shall have due regard to the latest relevant ITU-R Recommendations.

Type B (footnote 5.150) = frequency bands are also designated for ISM applications. Radiocommunication services operating within these bands must accept harmful interference which may be caused by these applications.

ITU RR, (Footnote 5.280) = In Germany, Austria, Bosnia and Herzegovina, Croatia, North Macedonia, Liechtenstein, Montenegro, Portugal, Serbia, Slovenia and Switzerland, the band 433.05-434.79 MHz (center frequency 433.92 MHz) is designated for ISM applications. Radio communication services of these countries operating within this band must accept harmful interference which may be caused by these applications.

History

The ISM bands were first established at the International Telecommunications Conference of the ITU in Atlantic City, 1947. The American delegation specifically proposed several bands, including the now commonplace 2.4 GHz band, to accommodate the then nascent process of microwave heating; however, FCC annual reports of that time suggest that much preparation was done ahead of these presentations.

The report of the August 9th 1947 meeting of the Allocation of Frequencies committee includes the remark:

"The delegate of the United States, referring to his request that the frequency 2450 Mc/s be allocated for I.S.M., indicated that there was in existence in the United States, and working on this frequency a diathermy machine and an electronic cooker, and that the latter might eventually be installed in transatlantic ships and airplanes. There was therefore some point in attempting to reach world agreement on this subject."

Radio frequencies in the ISM bands have been used for communication purposes, although such devices may experience interference from non-communication sources. In the United States, as early as 1958 Class D Citizens Band, a Part 95 service, was allocated to frequencies that are also allocated to ISM. [1]

In the U.S., the FCC first made unlicensed spread spectrum available in the ISM bands in rules adopted on May 9, 1985.

Many other countries later developed similar regulations, enabling use of this technology.  The FCC action was proposed by Michael Marcus of the FCC staff in 1980 and the subsequent regulatory action took five more years. It was part of a broader proposal to allow civil use of spread spectrum technology and was opposed at the time by mainstream equipment manufacturers and many radio system operators.

Applications 
 Industrial, scientific and medical (ISM) applications (of radio frequency energy) (short: ISM applications) are – according to article 1.15 of the International Telecommunication Union´s (ITU) ITU Radio Regulations (RR) – defined as «Operation of equipment or appliances designed to generate and use locally radio frequency energy for industrial, scientific, medical, domestic or similar purposes, excluding applications in the field of telecommunications.»

The original ISM specifications envisioned that the bands would be used primarily for noncommunication purposes, such as heating.  The bands are still widely used for these purposes.  For many people, the most commonly encountered ISM device is the home microwave oven operating at 2.45 GHz which uses microwaves to cook food.  Industrial heating is another big application area; such as induction heating, microwave heat treating, plastic softening, and plastic welding processes.  In medical settings, shortwave and microwave diathermy machines use radio waves in the ISM bands to apply deep heating to the body for relaxation and healing.  More recently hyperthermia therapy uses microwaves to heat tissue to kill cancer cells.

However, as detailed below, the increasing congestion of the radio spectrum, the increasing sophistication of microelectronics, and the attraction of unlicensed use, has in recent decades led to an explosion of uses of these bands for short range communication systems for wireless devices, which are now by far the largest uses of these bands.  These are sometimes called "non ISM" uses since they do not fall under the originally envisioned "industrial", "scientific", and "medical" application areas. One of the largest applications has been wireless networking (Wi-Fi). The IEEE 802.11 wireless networking protocols, the standards on which almost all wireless systems are based, use the ISM bands. Virtually all laptops, tablet computers, computer printers and cellphones now have 802.11 wireless modems using the 2.4 and 5.7 GHz ISM bands. Bluetooth is another networking technology using the 2.4 GHz band, which can be problematic given the probability of interference. Near-field communication (NFC) devices such as proximity cards and contactless smart cards use the lower frequency 13 and 27 MHz ISM bands.  Other short range devices using the ISM bands are: wireless microphones, baby monitors, garage door openers, wireless doorbells, keyless entry systems for vehicles, radio control channels for UAVs (drones), wireless surveillance systems, RFID systems for merchandise, and wild animal tracking systems.

Some electrodeless lamp designs are ISM devices, which use RF emissions to excite fluorescent tubes. Sulfur lamps are commercially available plasma lamps, which use a 2.45 GHz magnetron to heat sulfur into a brightly glowing plasma.

Long-distance wireless power systems have been proposed and experimented with which would use high-power transmitters and rectennas, in lieu of overhead transmission lines and underground cables, to send power to remote locations. NASA has studied using microwave power transmission on 2.45 GHz to send energy collected by solar power satellites back to the ground.

Also in space applications, a Helicon Double Layer ion thruster is a prototype spacecraft propulsion engine which uses a 13.56 MHz transmission to break down and heat gas into plasma.

Common non-ISM uses
In recent years ISM bands have also been shared with (non-ISM) license-free error-tolerant communications applications such as wireless sensor networks in the 915 MHz and 2.450 GHz bands, as well as wireless LANs and cordless phones in the 915 MHz, 2.450 GHz, and 5.800 GHz bands. Because unlicensed devices are required to be tolerant of ISM emissions in these bands, unlicensed low power users are generally able to operate in these bands without causing problems for ISM users. ISM equipment does not necessarily include a radio receiver in the ISM band (e.g. a microwave oven does not have a receiver).

In the United States, according to 47 CFR Part 15.5, low power communication devices must accept interference from licensed users of that frequency band, and the Part 15 device must not cause interference to licensed users. Note that the 915 MHz band should not be used in countries outside Region 2, except those that specifically allow it, such as Australia and Israel, especially those that use the GSM-900 band for cellphones.  The ISM bands are also widely used for Radio-frequency identification (RFID) applications with the most commonly used band being the 13.56 MHz band used by systems compliant with ISO/IEC 14443 including those used by biometric passports and contactless smart cards.

In Europe, the use of the ISM band is covered by Short Range Device regulations issued by European Commission, based on technical recommendations by CEPT and standards by ETSI. In most of Europe, LPD433 band is allowed for license-free voice communication in addition to PMR446.

Wireless network devices use wavebands as follows:
 IEEE 802.11/Wi-Fi 2450 MHz and 5800 MHz bands
 Bluetooth 2450 MHz band falls under WPAN

Wireless LANs and cordless phones can also use bands other than those shared with ISM, but such uses require approval on a country by country basis. DECT phones use allocated spectrum outside the ISM bands that differs in Europe and North America. Ultra-wideband LANs require more spectrum than the ISM bands can provide, so the relevant standards such as IEEE 802.15.4a are designed to make use of spectrum outside the ISM bands.  Despite the fact that these additional bands are outside the official ITU-R ISM bands, because they are used for the same types of low power personal communications, they are sometimes incorrectly referred to as ISM bands as well.

Several brands of radio control equipment use the  band range for low power remote control of toys, from gas powered cars to miniature aircraft.

Worldwide Digital Cordless Telecommunications or WDCT is a technology that uses the  radio spectrum.

Google's Project Loon used ISM bands (specifically 2.4 and 5.8 GHz bands) for balloon-to-balloon and balloon-to-ground communications.

Pursuant to 47 CFR Part 97 some ISM bands are used by licensed amateur radio operators for communication - including amateur television.

See also 
 Frequency allocation
 Fixed wireless
 LPD433
 Electromagnetic interference at 2.4 GHz

Notes

References

External links 

Cordless phone frequencies
ITU page on definitions of ISM bands
ITU page on Radio Regulations
European Radiocommunications Office frequency information system 
In the US, CFR 07/47cfr18 07.html Title 47 Part 18 describes the regulation of the ISM bands.  contains some of the regulations for wireless LAN devices operating in three of the low power communication, Part 15, bands.

Bandplans
Radio regulations